Verena Stefan (3 October 1947 – 29 November 2017) was a Swiss-born feminist and writer living in Germany, later in Canada.

She was born in Bern and moved to Berlin in 1968 to become a physical therapist and study sociology at the Free University of Berlin. Her first book Häutungen (Shedding) (1975) was based on her experiences living in Berlin. In 1980, she published a book of poems Mit Füßen, mit Flügeln (With feet, with wings).

With Gabriele Meixner, she has published German translations of Dream of a Common Language by Adrienne Rich and Lesbian Peoples by Monique Wittig. Stefan has also published essays on writing for Die Zeit and Frauenoffensive.

She lived together with Lise Moisan and  died in Montreal on 29 November 2017.

References 

1947 births
2017 deaths
German women poets
German feminists
People from Bern
Free University of Berlin alumni
Lesbian poets
German women essayists
German essayists
German lesbian writers
German LGBT poets
20th-century German poets
20th-century German translators
20th-century German women writers
20th-century LGBT people